Miguel Eduardo Galván Meza (October 13, 1957 – April 14, 2008) was a Mexican comedian and actor, known for his appearances on TV shows like La Parodia and La Hora Pico.
He died due to a respiratory arrest in a hospital.

Biography
He was born in Juan Aldama, Zacatecas, and studied to be an architect before taking three years of theatre classes. He rose to fame in a TV commercial for the defunct bank Bital (now HSBC México) where he played a filthy but comic prison inmate. His nickname La Tartamuda (The Stutterer, a comparison with the onomatopoeia of a gun firing bullets) originated from this part.

He acted in films including Perdita Durango (1997), Sexo, pudor y lágrimas (1999) and Mejor que la vida (2008), although he was most famous for his TV work. He starred in La Hora Pico (Rush Hour), first aired in 2000. In the show, he took the role of many characters such as La Madre Sota (Spanish word-play, "the big mother"), El Pollero. In La Parodia he played characters like Shrek, Carmelita Salinas (after Carmen Salinas), Laura (after Laura Bozzo), and others, starring along with Arath de la Torre, Angélica Vale and "Los Masca Brothers", Freddy and Germán Ortega.

He also starred in several Mexican telenovelas. In 2003, he co-starred with Andrea Legarreta and Eduardo Capetillo in the children's soap opera ¡Vivan los niños!, and in 2007 on Destilando Amor which marked his last TV appearance.

Death
He suffered diabetes and hypertension. He was hospitalized when he fainted after a theatrical performance. He had three hemodialysis sessions, but his health continued to deteriorate and he died on Monday, April 14, 2008. He was cremated, and, following his wishes, half of his ashes went to a church in Lindavista, the other half were scattered in the sea off Acapulco.

References

External links
Comediantes.net
El Universal on Galván's death

1957 births
2008 deaths
Mexican male comedians
Mexican male film actors
Mexican male telenovela actors
Mexican male television actors
Male actors from Zacatecas
20th-century Mexican male actors
21st-century Mexican male actors
20th-century comedians